Ely, Cambridgeshire has 182 listed buildings.

Notable buildings

See also

References
Notes

Bibliography
 
 
 
 

Ely, Cambridgeshire
Ely